East Midlands Parkway railway station is located north of Ratcliffe-on-Soar on the Midland Main Line in the East Midlands of England.

When it opened, there was a little-used shuttle bus from the station to the airport, but this ceased not long afterwards. An hourly minibus service was re-introduced in 2015 but later withdrawn. The main station building and the 850-vehicle car park are to the west of the line, opposite Ratcliffe-on-Soar Power Station. Road access is via the A453, which provides a link to the nearby M1 motorway.

Description
East Midlands Parkway is located near the village of Ratcliffe-on-Soar in Nottinghamshire, close to the River Trent. Ratcliffe-on-Soar power station is next to the railway on the eastern side. Just north of the station is Trent Junction, where the lines to Nottingham and Sheffield (via Derby) diverge. There are four platforms, two serving the western, "fast" lines, and two serving the eastern, "slow" lines.

Services
Fears were raised by various bodies including East Midlands Airport, about the service pattern proposed for the new station in 2008.

Donington Park motor racing circuit is nearby, and its then-owners expressed their desire for spectators to use the station or coach services when travelling to the circuit. The owners were also in support of any future light rail transport to East Midlands Airport itself.

All trains serving the station are operated by East Midlands Railway. The service pattern from London sees two northbound trains per hour (one each to Sheffield and to Nottingham), which leave within seven minutes of each other, and two per hour to London, which leave within 10 minutes of each other.

History
Building work commenced on the new £25.5million station on 19 December 2007. It was due to be completed by 14 December 2008, but did not finally open until 26 January 2009.

The train operating company Midland Mainline was, until October 2006, responsible for the project, which remained in the planning stages for several years for the want of a small piece of land needed for the project. Responsibility was then transferred to Network Rail which anticipated expenditure of £5million in 2006/07 and £8million in 2007/08.

In its first year of operation the station was used by over 250,000passengers.

Controversy
People in nearby towns including Loughborough voiced their concerns that the opening of the station could lead to the reduction in the number of trains stopping there, although this was denied by former operator Midland Mainline. Another concern was the possible withdrawal of the existing bus service from Loughborough station to East Midlands Airport. A service from Loughborough to the airport (now extended to start from Leicester) is still running; however, since 25 April 2010, it has ceased to serve Loughborough railway station. As a result, there are no longer any direct late-night or early-morning bus services between the railway station and the town centre, with only a limited (every 40minutes) service operating on Sundays.

First year
To mark the first year of operation of the station, East Midlands Trains offered unlimited travel from the station for the day on Saturday 30 January 2010 under the promotional 'Red Dot Day' banner. The 850 space car park was full for the first time since the station opened and 2,787 passengers travelled. The station saw 182,412journeys in its first full year of operation.

Criticism
The station has been criticised as being poorly located. In 2011-12, East Midlands Parkway attracted just over one third of the projected annual passengers.

Facilities
East Midlands Parkway is a staffed station with four platforms and a ticket office, which is open 06:00–19:30 on Mondays to Saturdays and 07:30–19:30 on Sundays. Other facilities include:

When opened 2009, East Midlands Parkway was one of the greenest stations in the United Kingdom. The station was built using locally sourced and recycled materials and uses a ground-source heating system.

In late 2009, East Midlands Parkway became a penalty fare station, so a valid ticket or permit to travel must be shown when requested.

Multi-modal
From 30 March 2009, the station has been used as an interchange station for combined multi-modal journeys using Megabus-branded services run by Stagecoach (the operators of both East Midlands Trains and of Megabus). The MegabusPlus services transport passengers from cities in the north of England to East Midlands Parkway, where passengers transfer to rail for the service to London.

Routes operated under the MegabusPlus brand are to/from:
London St Pancras International - Hull via Scunthorpe
London St Pancras International - Hull via York, Doncaster and Castleford
London St Pancras International - Bradford via Huddersfield and Halifax

Electrification and Future
The Midland Main Line is not electrified north of Kettering; therefore, all services are operated by diesel trains. This was set to change by 2019, when a scheme to electrify the remainder of the line had been due to be completed. This, along with increased line speeds, would have meant that the station would have been under 80minutes from the capital. However, the electrification scheme was cancelled in 2017.

In November 2021 the Government announced the abandonment of most of the eastern leg High Speed 2 and the Northern Powerhouse Rail scheme under the Integrated Rail Plan for the North and Midlands (IRP). As part of this the earlier proposal for the HS2 East Midlands Hub station on the Toton sidings site further north has been shelved and instead, the eastern leg of HS2 will connect to the Midland Line at a junction to the south of East Midlands Parkway. This will allow HS2 services to reach Derby and Nottingham directly, the absence of which was a criticism of the previous plan. The IRP also confirmed the rest of the Midland Line would be electrified, reversing a previous decision to cancel electrification.

References

External links

 East Midlands Parkway Station Information

Railway stations in Nottinghamshire
DfT Category C1 stations
Railway stations in Great Britain opened in 2009
Railway stations opened by Network Rail
Railway stations served by East Midlands Railway
East Midlands Airport
MacKellar Architecture railway stations